Frederik Lauesen (born 10 November 1972) is a Danish TV presenter, who has been head of sport for the Danish channel TV 2 since September 2008.

Career
He is well known in Denmark and France for presenting the sports news, including presenting of the Danish coverage of the Tour de France. He worked on TV 2 Sport from 1998, presenting the magazine show LPS, before becoming editorial director of the news department for a year. He was criticised by a women's handball team, FC Midtjylland, in December 2009 after he called the women's game unexciting.

Personal life
He grew up in Kolding. He lives in Odense with his two children. He met his Greenland-born wife Laila Sylvester Grossmann in 2000, and they married in 2006. She died in November 2007 aged 39 from a heart attack. Lauesen and his family received over one million krone in compensation for her death after making a complaint about the three doctors who treated her.

References

Danish television presenters
Living people
1972 births
Danish sports journalists